Maipomyia is a genus of flies in the family Dolichopodidae from Chile. The genus is named after the Maipo River.

Species 
 Maipomyia insolita Bickel, 2004
 Maipomyia velata Bickel, 2004

References 

Dolichopodidae genera
Medeterinae
Diptera of South America
Endemic fauna of Chile